Chae Tu-yong (born 15 August 1984) is a North Korean former footballer. He represented North Korea on at least nine occasion between 2003 and 2010.

Career statistics

International

References

1982 births
Living people
North Korean footballers
North Korea international footballers
Association football forwards